Ituna Valley is a narrow ice-free valley between Isca Valley and Lemanis Valley in the Britannia Range, Antarctica. It was named in association with "Britannia" by a University of Waikato geological party, 1978–79, led by Michael Selby. "Ituna" is a historical name used in Roman Britain for the River Eden, Cumbria.

External links 

 Ituna Valley on USGS website
 Ituna Valley on SCAR website
 Ituna Valley area Satellite image
 Ituna Valley area map

References 

Valleys of Oates Land